Ion C. Marinescu (November 10, 1886 – January 15, 1956) was a Romanian lawyer, politician and industrialist.

Born in Bucharest, Marinescu graduated from the Law faculty at the University of Bucharest. In 1922 he commissioned architect  to design and build an apartment building with two floors and a mansard roof on Tudor Arghezi Street, in Bucharest. 

Marinescu was Minister of National Economy under Ion Antonescu from May 26, 1941 to August 14, 1942, and also served as Minister of Finance from April 8 to September 25, 1942. On August 14, 1942 he became Minister of Justice, serving in that position until King Michael's Coup of August 23, 1944. Arrested in October, he was charged with contributing to Romania's attack on the Soviet Union via his submissive policy towards Nazi Germany. Tried before the Romanian People's Tribunals, he was sentenced to twenty years at hard labor on May 17, 1946. He spent time at the prisons in Jilava and Aiud, where he died nearly a decade later.

In November 1941, Marinescu was awarded the Order of the Crown of Romania, Grand Cross class.

Notes

1886 births
1956 deaths
Politicians from Bucharest
University of Bucharest alumni
Romanian businesspeople in the oil industry
Romanian Ministers of Justice
Romanian Ministers of Economy
People convicted by the Romanian People's Tribunals
Inmates of Aiud prison
Romanian people who died in prison custody
Grand Crosses of the Order of the Crown (Romania)
Romanian Ministers of Finance
Prisoners who died in Securitate custody